Lincoln County High School  is a Class AAA high school in Hamlin, West Virginia. It was built between 2004 and 2006 and completed in time for the 2006/07 school year.

Consolidation
Lincoln County High School was formed from four former high schools in the county: Guyan Valley High School in Pleasant View, Duval High School in Griffithsville, Hamlin High School in Hamlin, and Harts High School in Harts.

The idea for consolidation was discussed for years, and protests and votes held the process back. Finally in 2000 due to low standardized test scores and poor school conditions the state board of education took over the county school system. Almost immediately consolidation was put into action and Lincoln County High School was built.

Athletics
Lincoln County High School's Panther's colors are Carolina blue, black, and silver. 

The school offers the following West Virginia Secondary School Activities Commission (WVSSAC) sanctioned sports:

Baseball (boys)
Basketball (girls and boys) 
Cheerleading (girls) 
Cross country (girls and boys) 
Football (boys)
Golf (girls and boys) 
Soccer (girls and boys) 
Softball (girls) 
Tennis (girls and boys) 
Track (girls and boys) 
Volleyball (girls)
Wrestling (boys)

References

External links

Lincoln County School District

Educational institutions established in 2006
Public high schools in West Virginia
Education in Lincoln County, West Virginia
Buildings and structures in Lincoln County, West Virginia
2006 establishments in West Virginia